Bexhill College is a sixth form college in the south-east of England. The college is based in Bexhill-on-Sea, East Sussex and is located on Penland Road, north-east of the town centre. The college has maintained an Ofsted rating of Good in its Ofsted report since 2010, with its most recent being in 2019.

History 
Bexhill College is the direct successor of the County Schools for Boys and Girls, opened on 5 October 1926. In 1945 following the Education Act, the schools became Grammar Schools. The Boys' and Girls' County Grammar Schools merged on 26 September 1970 and became a sixth form college in 1977. The college was initially located on Turkey Road in Sidley, but relocated officially to Penland Road in late c2006.

General information
As of 2018, the college enrolls nearly 2000 students with the majority of the day students aged 16–19. The main college buildings are located all on one site, with a wide range of facilities catering for the 80 plus courses available.

The college also runs an adult learning centre, offering recreational evening and daytime classes as well as a range of qualification courses.
 
The college is co-located with post-16 students of Glyne Gap School. The Glyne Gap students have been given their own open-air space within the college grounds.

Facilities

Bexhill College has a variety of facilities, all located on its 5.6-hectare site.  
Izzard Theatre was opened in December 2013 by Eddie Izzard. It is a 200-seater space, with retractable seating. The theatre is used for multiple events such as shows performed by students to assemblies and political hustings.
Sports facilities consist of a 3G all weather pitch, 2 dance studios, an indoor multisport hall, a climbing wall, 3 tennis courts, a large grass training area and a modern gym.
Learning Resource Centre (LRC)
Hair training salon 
Catering kitchen 
Recording studio 
Music and music technology suites
Fully equipped TV studio / editing suite 
Drama Studio
Refectory
Science Laboratories

Current student life

Students who attend the college are from Bexhill and the surrounding areas of Rother, Hastings and Eastbourne. Full-time students study a wide range of courses including vocational ones, GCSEs and A-Level qualifications. The college will additionally begin to offer T-Levels from 2021.

Enrichment

The college’s enrichment programme gives students the opportunity to take part in extra-curricular activities throughout the year.

The college also offers a sport academy programme, which means students represent their college in competitions or games, alongside their studies. The sports available are: Athletics, Badminton, Basketball, Cricket, Football (the academy is in association with Chelsea FC foundation), Golf, Netball, Performing arts, Rugby, Swimming, Table tennis, Tennis and Volleyball.

There is also a Performing Arts Academy in which the students can develop their full potential in singing, dancing, acting and performing.

International students
International students have a choice of accommodation, which include Bexhill College’s own student houses or living with a Host Family.

Adult education
Despite being primarily for 16-19 year olds, Bexhill College offers adult education classes. These are run through the day and as evening classes. The college offers professional qualifications such as certificates, diplomas, as well as a wide range of GCSEs and other recreational courses.

Notable alumni 
Godfrey Argent, photographer
Jo Brand, comedian, writer and actress
 Michael Cowpland, businessman
Gordon Hillman, archaeologist
Mike Leadbitter, journalist
 James McCartney, musician
 Stella McCartney, fashion designer
Hayley Okines, activist
John Pitman, journalist
Francis Robinson, historian
Charity Wakefield, actress

References

External links
Bexhill College

International Baccalaureate schools in England
Sixth form colleges in East Sussex
Bexhill-on-Sea